Cheenti Cheenti Bang Bang is a 2008 Indian animated comedy film directed by R D Mallik.

Reception
The film was widely panned by the critics. Gaurav Malani of The Economics Times wrote "Flipping across an antique ant-elephant joke book would be more amusing. Cheenti Cheenti Bang Bang surely calls for some pest control." The Indian movie website Indiaglitz.com gave a negative review, saying "On the whole, Cheenti Cheenti Bang Bang fails to get added with Antz or A Bug's life", and both awarded the film single star out of five.

Soundtrack

See also
List of Indian animated feature films

References

External links
 

2000s Hindi-language films

Indian animated films
Indian children's films
Animated films about insects
Films scored by Jeet Ganguly